October 14 - Eastern Orthodox liturgical calendar - October 16

All fixed commemorations below celebrated on October 28 by Eastern Orthodox Churches on the Old Calendar.

For October 15th, Orthodox Churches on the Old Calendar commemorate the Saints listed on October 2.

Saints
 Martyrs Sarbelus (Thathuil) and his sister Bebaia, of Edessa (98-138)  (see also: January 29 )
 Hieromartyr Lucian of Antioch, Presbyter of Greater Antioch (312)
 Venerable Barsus the Confessor, Bishop of Edessa (378)
 Saint Sabinus, Bishop of Catania, Wonderworker (760)
 Venerable Euthymius the New, of Thessalonica, Confessor (889)  (see also: January 4)

Pre-Schism Western saints
 Saint Agileus, martyred in Carthage in North Africa,  (c. 300)
 Saint Aurelia of Strasbourg (Alsace, Gaul) (c. 383)
 Saint Severus of Trier, Bishop of Trier in Germany, Confessor (c. 455)
 Saint Antiochus of Lyon (Andeol), Bishop of Lyon (5th century)
 Saint Cannatus (Canus Natus), Bishop of Marseilles in France after St Honoratus (5th century)
 Saint Fortunatus, a martyr in Rome (537?)
 Saint Leonard of Vandœuvre, a hermit who founded Vandoeuvre, now Saint-Leonard-aux-Bois, near Le Mans in France (c. 570)
 Saint Thecla, Abbess, of Ochsenfurt, Germany (c. 790)
 Saint Odilo, a monk at Gorze Abbey in Lorraine in France, who became Abbot of Stavelot-Malmédy in Belgium (c. 954)
 Saint Callistus, martyr (1003)
 Saint Bruno of Merseburg (Bruno-Boniface), Archbishop of Mersburg, martyred by the heathen Prussians (1009)
 Saint Willa, a nun at Nonnberg Abbey near Salzburg in Austria who reposed as an anchoress (c. 1050)

Post-Schism Orthodox saints
 Hieromartyr Lucian, Hieromonk of the Kiev Caves (1243)
 Saint John, Bishop of Suzdal (1373)
 Saint Dionysius, Archbishop of Suzdal (1385)

New Martys and Confessors
 New Hieromartyr Martyr Symeon Konyukhov, Priest (1918)
 New Hieromartyr Valerian Novitsky, Priest, of Telyadovich (1930)
 New Hieromartyr Demetrius Kasatkin, Priest (1942)
 New Hiero-confessor Athanasius (Sakharov), Bishop of Kovrov (1962)
 Synaxis of the 23 New Hieromartyrs of the Minsk Diocese of Belorussia (1930-1950):
 Archimandrite: Seraphim (Shakhmut), of Zhyrovichy Monastery (1945); 
 Priests: Alexander Shalai (1937); Vladimir Zubkovich (1938); Vladimir Izmailov (1930); Vladimir Pasternatsky (1938); Vladimir Khirasko (1932); Dimitry Pavsky (1937); John Voronet (1937); Leonid Biryukovich (1937); Matthew Kritsuk (1950); Michael Novitsky (1935); Michael Plyshevsky (1937); Porphyrius Rubanovich (1937); Sergius Rodakovsky (1933); Valerian Novitsky (1930); Vladimir Taliush (1933); Vladimir Khrischanovich (1933); Dimitry Plyshevsky (1938); John Vecherko (1933); John Pankratovich (1937); Nicholas Matskevich (1937); Peter Grudinsky (1930); and
 Deacon: Nicholas Vasyukovich (1937).

Other commemorations
 Icon of the Most Holy Theotokos "She Who Ripens the Grain" / "The Grower of Crops" (19th century)

Icon gallery

Notes

References

Sources 
 October 15/28. Orthodox Calendar (PRAVOSLAVIE.RU).
 October 28 / October 15. HOLY TRINITY RUSSIAN ORTHODOX CHURCH (A parish of the Patriarchate of Moscow).
 October 15. OCA - The Lives of the Saints.
 The Autonomous Orthodox Metropolia of Western Europe and the Americas (ROCOR). St. Hilarion Calendar of Saints for the year of our Lord 2004. St. Hilarion Press (Austin, TX). pp. 76–77.
 The Fifteenth Day of the Month of October. Orthodoxy in China.
 October 15. Latin Saints of the Orthodox Patriarchate of Rome.
 The Roman Martyrology. Transl. by the Archbishop of Baltimore. Last Edition, According to the Copy Printed at Rome in 1914. Revised Edition, with the Imprimatur of His Eminence Cardinal Gibbons. Baltimore: John Murphy Company, 1916. pp. 318–319.
 Rev. Richard Stanton. A Menology of England and Wales, or, Brief Memorials of the Ancient British and English Saints Arranged According to the Calendar, Together with the Martyrs of the 16th and 17th Centuries. London: Burns & Oates, 1892. pp. 493–494.
Greek Sources
 Great Synaxaristes:  15 ΟΚΤΩΒΡΙΟΥ. ΜΕΓΑΣ ΣΥΝΑΞΑΡΙΣΤΗΣ.
  Συναξαριστής. 15 Οκτωβρίου. ECCLESIA.GR. (H ΕΚΚΛΗΣΙΑ ΤΗΣ ΕΛΛΑΔΟΣ).
  15/10/2017. Ορθόδοξος Συναξαριστής. 
Russian Sources
  28 октября (15 октября). Православная Энциклопедия под редакцией Патриарха Московского и всея Руси Кирилла (электронная версия). (Orthodox Encyclopedia - Pravenc.ru).
  15 октября по старому стилю / 28 октября по новому стилю. Русская Православная Церковь - Православный церковный календарь на 2016 год.

October in the Eastern Orthodox calendar